The Women's 1000 metres in short track speed skating at the 1994 Winter Olympics took place on 26 February at the Hamar Olympic Amphitheatre.

Results

Heats
The first round was held on 26 February. There were eight heats, with the top two finishers moving on to the quarterfinals.

Heat 1

Heat 2

Heat 3

Heat 4

Heat 5

Heat 6

Heat 7

Heat 8

Quarterfinals
The quarterfinals were held on 26 February. The top two finishers in each of the four quarterfinals advanced to the semifinals.

Quarterfinal 1

Quarterfinal 2

Quarterfinal 3

Quarterfinal 4

Semifinals
The semifinals were held on 26 February. The top two finishers in each of the two semifinals qualified for the A final, while the third and fourth place skaters advanced to the B Final. In semifinal 2, China's Yang Yang (S) was advanced to the final, and Canada's Sylvie Daigle was disqualified.

Semifinal 1

Semifinal 2

Finals
The five qualifying skaters competed in Final A, while Canada's Isabelle Charest raced alone for 5th place in Final B.

Final A

Final B

References

Women's short track speed skating at the 1994 Winter Olympics
Skat